An Na (born 1972) is a South Korea-born American children's book author. She gained success with her first novel A Step From Heaven, published by Front Street Press in 2001, which won the annual Michael L. Printz Award from the American Library Association recognizing the year's "best book written for teens, based entirely on its literary merit". It was also a finalist for the National Book Award, Young People's Literature, and later found its way onto numerous "best book" lists.

Life 
Na grew up in San Diego, California, and has a bachelor of arts from Amherst College. Starting her career as a middle school English and History teacher, Na turned to writing novels after taking a young adult literature class while enrolled in an M.F.A. program at Vermont College of Fine Arts. She divides her time between Oakland, California and Warren, Vermont, and makes frequent visits to middle schools to talk about her works and  encourages young Asian-American students to become artists and harness their creativity.

Influences 
Na cites Frank McCourt's Angela's Ashes and Sandra Cisneros's The House on Mango Street among the influences on her writing and also admires the work of Madeleine L'Engle and of her first writing teacher, Jacqueline Woodson.

Works 
 A Step From Heaven (2001)
 Wait For Me (2006)
 The Fold (2008)
 Akbar : The Great Emperor of India
 The Place Between Breaths (2018)

See also

References 

Teaching Multicultural Literature, Workshop 4, Authors and Literary Works, Biography 
Interview with Young Adult Author An Na

External links
 
 Biography from the international literature festival berlin
 

1972 births
American children's writers
American writers of Korean descent
Michael L. Printz Award winners
Amherst College alumni
Vermont College of Fine Arts alumni
Living people
Date of birth missing (living people)
People from Washington County, Vermont
Writers from Oakland, California
American writers of young adult literature
American women children's writers
21st-century American women